Arrochar (or ) is a village located near the head of Loch Long, on the Cowal peninsula in Argyll and Bute, Scottish Highlands.  The village is within the Loch Lomond and The Trossachs National Park.

Historically in Dunbartonshire, it is overlooked by a group of mountains called the Arrochar Alps, and in particular by the distinctive rocky summit of the Cobbler. It enjoys good communications as it is at the junction of the A83 and A814 roads and is served by Arrochar and Tarbet railway station.

For over five centuries this area, the feudal barony of Arrochar, was held by the chiefs of Clan MacFarlane and before them by their ancestors the barons of Arrochar.
The family is Celtic in the male line and native to their Highland homeland of tall peaks and deep lochs just above the waist of Scotland.
The settlement was a key target for Viking raiders who took their boats  overland to Tarbet to attack the unprotected inland settlements at Loch Lomond  before their defeat in 1263 at the battle of Largs.

The western end of Arrochar marks the traditional boundary of Argyllshire and Dunbartonshire, and this remained the case under local government reorganisation in 1975. However, in 1996 the boundaries of Argyll and Bute and West Dunbartonshire were substantially redrawn, bringing the whole area into Argyll and Bute.

Arrochar Torpedo Testing Facility

The photograph shows the former torpedo testing facility at the head of Loch Long. It was decommissioned in 1980 and is currently part demolished. Demolition has been stalled since a fire on the site in June 2007.

Torpedoes were fired up Loch Long from tubes at the front of the facility. A boat stood by to recover the (unarmed) torpedoes where they were returned for analysis. The now roofless shed to the left and the main part of the building have tracks where torpedoes were stored and worked on. Hoists on the first floor lowered the torpedoes into the tubes.

The control room at the top looking straight down the loch housed a camera. Behind the control room, above the loading shed, is office accommodation. The rest of the facility included housing and workshops but these have been sold off.

See also
List of places in Argyll and Bute

References

External links 

 The Official Homepage of the International Clan MacFarlane Society, Inc.
 Arrochar, Tarbet and Ardlui History - website
 Three Villages Community - website.
 The Loch Lomond and The Trossachs National Park - website
 Video footage of the old Arrochar Pier
 Video footage of Arrochar & Tarbet railway station

Highlands and Islands of Scotland
Villages in Cowal